Guts of a Virgin is the first album by American band Painkiller, a band featuring John Zorn, Bill Laswell and Mick Harris. It contains twelve tracks and was released in 1991 on Toy's Factory in Japan and Earache Records in England.

Artwork
The cover art, which features a bald woman with her insides exposed, was censored, seized and destroyed the first shipment in the UK after c for violating the Obscene Publications Act.

Critical reception
The Quietus called the album "intense but still something you could call 'rock.'" Trouser Press called it an "exposition of versatile thrash jazz," writing that "each instrument occupies its own sonic terrain, combining in a sprawl of unanticipated death metal."

Track listing

Personnel
John Zorn – alto saxophone, vocals
Bill Laswell – bass
Mick Harris – drums, vocals
Production

 Wes Naprstek – engineering
 Howie Weinberg – mastering
 Oz Fritz – mixing
 Lisa Wells – photography
 Tanaka Tomoyo, Anthony Lee – design

Publishing

 M.P.O – pressing
 Earache, Theater of Musical Optics, Nation Music – publishing

References

1991 EPs
Painkiller (band) albums
Albums produced by John Zorn
Earache Records albums